The British Society of Dowsers was founded in 1933 by Colonel A H Bell. They are a company limited by guarantee and a registered charity whose objects are: "to encourage and support the study and practice of dowsing and its application in every field of human interest; to maintain a public dowsing information service, including a Register of Dowsing Practitioners and a Register of Dowsing Tutors, and training programme; and to relieve communities, particularly those in less well developed countries, who are suffering hardship by reason of their economic and social circumstances, especially in relation to water supplies."

References

External links
www.britishdowsers.org

Charities based in Worcestershire
Dowsing
1933 establishments in the United Kingdom
Organizations established in 1933